Swimming at the 2019 Military World Games was held in Wuhan, China from 19 to 23 October 2019.

Medal summary

Men

 Swimmers who participated in the heats only and received medals.

Women

 Swimmers who participated in the heats only and received medals.

Mixed

 Swimmers who participated in the heats only and received medals.

Medal table

References

External links
Swimming at the 7th Military World Games
Results book

Cycling
2019
2019
2019 in swimming